"Christian Rock Hard" is the ninth episode of the seventh season and the 105th overall episode of the American animated series South Park. It originally aired on Comedy Central in the United States on October 29, 2003.

In the episode, the kids start a rock band, but concerned with the fact that people will potentially download their music from the Internet illegally, they refuse to play. Meanwhile, Cartman starts his own Christian rock band, called Faith + 1.

The episode satirizes famous artists who have spoken out against copyright infringement, such as Metallica, and also serves as a commentary on how most musicians do what they do mainly for profit gains. Christian rock music is also parodied as being identical to love songs, except for referencing Jesus in their lyrics.

Plot
Stan, Kyle, Kenny and Cartman form a band called Moop, but disagree on what direction they should take, as they all like different types of music. The disagreement becomes so heated that Cartman bets that he will have a platinum-selling Christian rock album before Kyle's band does, and leaves the band.  Seeking inspiration, Stan, Kyle and Kenny illegally download music from the Internet. They are immediately arrested by the FBI, and are told of the serious consequences of illegal downloading, namely forcing musicians like Lars Ulrich (drummer of metal band Metallica), Britney Spears, and Master P to lose so much income from music piracy that they must either downgrade their extremely lavish purchases to very-slightly less lavish ones or save up until they can afford all of what they want. As a result, Moop decides to go on strike until fans stop downloading illegally and are joined by a large number of musicians, including Britney Spears, Ozzy Osbourne, Missy Elliott, Master P, Blink-182, Metallica, Alanis Morissette, Meat Loaf, Rancid, and even Skyler's band, the Lords of the Underworld.

Meanwhile, Cartman enlists Butters and Tolkien to form his new band. Realizing that Christian rock is a perennial top seller, Cartman decides that his band, which he has christened Faith + 1, will join the Christian music racket. Cartman builds the band's repertoire by simply taking vague generic pop love ballads and changing references like "baby" to "Jesus". While effective, the band eventually comes under some scrutiny when one of the songs involves more passionate and sexual lyrics involving Christ. Cartman manages to manipulate his way out and the band begins to build a huge following.

Before long, Faith + 1 celebrates the sale of its millionth album. By this time, Stan, Kyle and Kenny decide that the satisfaction of having fans should be more important to musicians than fighting against the fans who make them popular and go to see their concerts. They decide that touring still brings in revenue and call off their strike. However, the other musicians do not follow suit, because, according to Britney Spears, "[they are] just about the money."

Cartman has spent all the money made from their album on a lavish, extravagant awards ceremony to celebrate Faith + 1's success, and specifically to insult Kyle for losing the bet to Cartman. However, Cartman's jubilation is short-lived. As it turns out, Cartman is told that Christian record companies only hand out gold, frankincense and myrrh records, so Faith + 1, as Christian artists, will never have a platinum album (which is not true in real life), meaning that Kyle technically did not lose the bet and never will.  Cartman, enraged at this turn of events, destroys the band's myrrh album award, screaming "Goddammit!" and "Fuck Jesus!" This blasphemy causes the horrified fans to scream and flee.

When Token angrily confronts Cartman for spending every penny of their take, driving away their fans and ending the career of the band, Cartman continues to rant and insults him by calling him a "black asshole". In response, Token assaults Cartman on the stage before walking away. Conceding that Cartman got what he deserved, Stan, Kenny and Kyle also leave. As Cartman lies moaning in pain on the stage, Butters approaches him meekly. Butters then farts in Cartman's face, gives him the finger, and says "Fuck you, Eric," before walking away himself, leaving Cartman all alone to recover from his pain and humiliation.

Home media
"Christian Rock Hard", along with the fourteen other episodes from The Complete Seventh Season, were released on a three-disc DVD set in the United States on March 21, 2006. The sets included brief audio commentaries by Parker and Stone for each episode. IGN gave the season an 8/10.

References

External links
 "Christian Rock Hard" Full episode at South Park Studios
 

Christian rock
South Park (season 7) episodes